George William Hervey, 2nd Earl of Bristol (3 August 1721 – 18? or 20? March 1775), the eldest son of John Hervey, 2nd Baron Hervey, by his marriage with Mary (1700–1768), daughter of Nicholas Lepell.

Lord Bristol served for some years in the army, and in 1755 was sent to Turin as envoy extraordinary. He was ambassador at Madrid from 1758 to 1761, filling a difficult position with credit and dignity, and ranked among the followers of Pitt.

Appointed Lord Lieutenant of Ireland in 1766, he never visited that country during his short tenure of this office, and, after having served for a short time as keeper of the Privy Seal, became groom of the stool to George III in January 1770. He died unmarried, and was succeeded by his brother.

References

1721 births
1775 deaths
102
Lords Privy Seal
Diplomatic peers
George Hervey, 2nd Earl of Bristol
Ambassadors of Great Britain to Spain
Grooms of the Stool
Lords Lieutenant of Ireland
Court of George III of the United Kingdom